Scylacosuchus is an extinct genus of therocephalian therapsids. It was a predatory eutherocephalian that lived in Lopingian epoch. Its fossils were found in Orenburg Oblast of Russia. The type species is Scylacosuchus orenburgensis.

References 
 Valentin P. Tverdokhlebov, Galina I. Tverdokhlebova, Alla V. Minikh, Mikhail V. Surkov, and Michael J. Benton, (2005) Upper Permian vertebrates and their sedimentological context in the South Urals, Russia, Earth-Science Reviews 69 27-77 55

Eutherocephalians
Therocephalia genera
Lopingian synapsids of Europe
Prehistoric synapsids of Europe
Fossil taxa described in 1968
Taxa named by Leonid Petrovich Tatarinov